The Kasımiye Medrese or Kasim Pasha Medrese is a former madrasa in Mardin, Turkey.

Geography
The medrese is located southwest of the city centre of old Mardin.

History
The medrese was begun sultan Al-Zahir Majd al-Din 'Isā ibn Dāwūd (or İsa Bey) of the Artuqid dynasty, rulers of an Anatolian beylik. However, he was killed in a battle against the Karakoyunlu in 1407, before the building was fully constructed. The construction was resumed after the city fell to the Akkoyunlu Turkmens. Kasım, a son of Akkoyunlu sultan Mu'izz-al-Din, is credited with completing the medrese in 1445.

In 1924, all medreses in Turkey were closed down within a general attack on religious life and a top-down attempt to secularise society.

The building
The main building is rectangular. The entrance through an ornamented portal is from the south. In the courtyard there is a pool. The water source is a funnel in the wall that represents birth. The water from the pool drains through a narrow slit that represents death and sırat (in Islamic belief a narrow bridge on hell which leads to paradise) . The classrooms surround the pool. The classroom doors are kept deliberately low to ensure students would bow reverently before their teachers as they entered.

Elephant clock
On the north of the iwan there is the reproduction of an elephant clock designed by al-Jazari, a 12th-century Muslim engineer.

References

Buildings and structures completed in 1469
Buildings and structures in Mardin
Madrasas in Turkey